Edward Alfred Alexander Baldwin, 4th Earl Baldwin of Bewdley (3 January 1938 – 16 June 2021) was a British educator, hereditary peer, and Crossbench member of the House of Lords.

Early life and education

Baldwin was born on 3 January 1938. He was the only child of Arthur Baldwin, 3rd Earl Baldwin of Bewdley and the former Joan Elspeth Tomes (1901–1980). His paternal grandparents were Lucy Baldwin and Stanley Baldwin, 1st Earl Baldwin of Bewdley, three-time Prime Minister of the United Kingdom.  His maternal grandparents were Harriot (née Hancock) Tomes and Charles Alexander Tomes, an American-born merchant in the Far East with Shewan, Tomes & Co.

Baldwin was educated at Eton College and Trinity College, Cambridge, where he studied modern languages and law.

Career

Before entering Trinity College, Baldwin served from 1956 until 1958 as a second lieutenant in the Intelligence Corps. Between 1970 and 1987, he served in a variety of education positions, initially as a school teacher (teaching German and French) and latterly as Area Education Officer for Oxfordshire from 1980 to 1987.

On the death of his father in 1976, Baldwin became a member of the House of Lords and was one of the ninety elected hereditary peers who remained after the passing of the House of Lords Act 1999. From 1990 to 1998, he was Chairman of the British Acupuncture Accreditation Board.

While in the House of Lords, he was Joint Chairman of Parliamentary Group for Alternative and Complementary Medicine from 1992 to 2002. Baldwin was also a member of the Select Committee of Inquiry into Complementary and Alternative Medicine in 2000. From 2005 to 2010, he was Joint Chairman of the All Party Parliamentary Group Against Fluoridation. In addition, Baldwin was Secretary of the Associate Parliamentary Food and Health Forum.

Baldwin sat as a crossbencher until retiring under the House of Lords Reform Act 2014 in May 2018.

Baldwin spent much time trying to clear the name of his grandfather, Stanley Baldwin, whose character, motivation and actions as prime minister were questioned after the outbreak of World War II. He was particularly unhappy with the film The King's Speech due to its factual distortions and portrayal of his grandfather as a dithering fool who misunderstood Hitler's intentions.

Personal life and death
In 1970, Baldwin married Sarah MacMurray, the eldest daughter of Evan James of Upwood Park in Abingdon, County of Berkshire. They lived at Manor Farm House in Upper Wolvercote, Oxford, and were the parents of three sons: 
 Benedict Alexander Stanley Baldwin, 5th Earl Baldwin of Bewdley (born 28 December 1973)
 Hon. James Conrad Baldwin (born 13 March 1976)
 Hon. Mark Thomas Maitland Baldwin (born 24 July 1980)

Sarah died in 2001. In 2015, Baldwin married sculptor Lydia Segrave, the widow of economist Ian Little.

Baldwin was a member of the Marylebone Cricket Club. He lived in Cumnor Hill, near Oxford.

Lord Baldwin died on 16 June 2021, aged 83.  He was succeeded in the earldom and viscountcy by his eldest son, Benedict.

Works

Arms

References

External links
 

1938 births
2021 deaths
People educated at Eton College
Alumni of Trinity College, Cambridge
Earls Baldwin of Bewdley
Crossbench hereditary peers
Christ's Hospital staff
English people of American descent
Hereditary peers elected under the House of Lords Act 1999